Marshall Avery Howe (1867-1936) was an American botanist, taxonomist, morphologist, curator and the third director of the New York Botanical Garden.  He specialized in the study of liverworts (Hepaticae) and algae, and was also an expert on 
the cultivation of dahlias and other ornamental plants. He was an instructor in cryptogamic botany at the University of California at Berkeley and was appointed curator of the New York Botanical Garden in 1906, and assistant director in 1923, and director in 1935 after the death of Elmer Drew Merrill. In collecting for the gardens, he made numerous expeditions collecting algae and liverworts. He was an active member of the "Garden Club" in New York. He served as secretary then president of the Board of Trustees of the Pleasantville Free Library.

References

American botanists
1867 births
1936 deaths